Oleg Nikolayevich Kurdikov (born 13 April 1969) is a former Russian football player.

References

1969 births
Living people
Soviet footballers
FC Tyumen players
Russian footballers
Russian Premier League players
Association football defenders